Kamouraska was a federal electoral district in Quebec, Canada, that was represented in the House of Commons of Canada from 1869 to 1979. It was created by the British North America Act, 1867. There was no election in 1867 due to riots. There was a by-election held in 1869 in its place. The district was abolished in 1976 when it was redistributed into Bellechasse, Kamouraska—Rivière-du-Loup and Rimouski ridings.

Members of Parliament

This riding elected the following Members of Parliament:

Election results

See also 

 List of Canadian federal electoral districts
 Past Canadian electoral districts

External links
Riding history from the Library of Parliament

Former federal electoral districts of Quebec